The 2014 CONCACAF Girls' U-15 Championship was an association football tournament that took place in the Cayman Islands during August 2014. Each match lasted 70 minutes.

Participants

Venues

Group stage

Tiebreakers

The following tiebreaking criteria were established by CONCACAF:
Greatest number of points obtained in all group matches
Goal difference in all group matches
Greatest number of goals scored in all group matches
Greatest number of points obtained in matches amongst teams still tied
Lots drawn by the Organizing Committee

Group A

Group B

Group C

Group D

Knockout stage

In the knockout stages, if a match is level at the end of normal playing time, shall be played by penalty shoot-out to determine the winner.

Quarter-finals

Semi-finals

Third place playoff

Final

Goalscorers
6 goals

 Chelsea Green

 Nérilia Mondésir

5 goals

 Anyssa Ibrahim
 Sarah Stratigakis
 Jody Brown
 Merelyn Ashley Alvarado

4 goals

 Lauren Raimondo
 Lisbeth Bonilla

Player awards
Best XI
The Best XI was:
Goalkeeper:  Lysianne Proulx
Defence:  Emma Regan,  Samantha Chang,  Amaya Ellis,  Kennedy Faulknor
Midfield:  Chelsea Green,  Sarah Stratigakis,  Nahida Baalbaki,  Raenah Campbell
Attack:  Anyssa Ibrahim,  Nérilia Mondésir

The Technical Study Group named its award winners following the final:

Player of the Tournament (Golden Ball)
 Sarah Stratigakis
Golden Boot
 Chelsea Green &  Nérilia Mondésir 
Golden Glove
 Lysianne Proulx
Fair Play Award

References

External links
Under 15s – Girls, CONCACAF.com

2014
Girls' U-15 Championship 
Girls' U-15 Championship
2014 in women's association football
International association football competitions hosted by Cayman Islands